Soyeb Sopariya (born 10 September 1994) is an Indian cricketer. He made his List A debut on 10 October 2019, for Baroda in the 2019–20 Vijay Hazare Trophy. He made his first-class debut on 9 December 2019, for Baroda in the 2019–20 Ranji Trophy.

References

External links
 

1994 births
Living people
Indian cricketers
Baroda cricketers
Place of birth missing (living people)